John F. Frankel (born January 1961), more commonly known as John Frankel, is a British venture capitalist, author and speaker. Frankel is the founding partner at ff Venture Capital, a New York-based, seed stage investment firm.

Early life and education
John was born in January 1961 and grew up in London, England. He earned a Master of Arts from New College, Oxford where he studied Mathematics, Philosophy and Logic.

Career
John Frankel started his career in London in 1982 working at Arthur Andersen as a Chartered Accountant. There he worked in the audit and insolvency division. He then worked at Goldman Sachs for the next 21 years in a variety of roles including financial management, technology development, and reengineering.  He established Goldman’s Cayman offshore administration business, their London global custody business, and reengineered their global prime brokerage business.  He began angel investing in 1999. In 2008 he founded Ff Venture Capital in New York City.

Frankel has been an early investor and a director of many notable technology startups since 2008 including Parse.ly, UniKey, Klout, ThinkNear, Livefyre, Voxy, Centzy, Kohort, Phone.com, ThinkNear, Indiegogo, Plated, 500px, iClearpath, Contently and HowAboutWe. He invested in UniKey Technologies after hearing about the founder's appearance on the television show Shark Tank.

He was also one of the earliest investors in Quigo Technologies, which was purchased by AOL in December 2007 and in Cornerstone OnDemand which had a successful IPO in March 2011.

John Frankel is a frequent author and speaker both on television and at conferences and events. He also serves as a Mentor with the Entrepreneurs Roundtable Accelerator program. John Frankel is  a Fellow Chartered Accountant of the Institute of Chartered Accountants in England and Wales.

References

External links
ff Venture Capital (archive)

Living people
Businesspeople from New York City
Private equity and venture capital investors
Angel investors
American company founders
American corporate directors
1961 births